"Guitar Town" is a song written and recorded by American singer-songwriter Steve Earle. It was released in June 1986 as the second single and title track from the album Guitar Town.  The song reached number 7 on both the Billboard Hot Country Singles & Tracks chart and the Canadian RPM Country Tracks chart. It was Earle's highest peaking song to date on the country charts in both the U.S. and Canada.
Originally, the lyrics were "cheap guitar", but then changed to "Jap guitar".

Critical reception
Kip Kirby, of Billboard magazine reviewed the song favorably, saying that Earle "revives the tremolo-laden guitar sound of the early '60s for this song about music and love on the road."

Music video
The music video was directed by Gerry Wenner and premiered in mid-1986.

Chart performance

References

1986 singles
Steve Earle songs
Songs written by Steve Earle
Song recordings produced by Tony Brown (record producer)
Song recordings produced by Emory Gordy Jr.
MCA Records singles